The People's Council of Preslav took place in 893. It was among the most important events in the history of the First Bulgarian Empire and was a cornerstone of the Christianization of Bulgaria under prince Boris I.

Background and sources
In 889 Boris I abdicated and retired to a monastery and was succeeded by his eldest son Vladimir-Rasate who tried to restore Tengrism, the traditional religion of the country since 681. After Vladimir-Rasate was deposed by his father in 893, the latter gathered a People's Council in Preslav to legitimate the changes. Since the issues to be discussed were of great importance for the whole country, the attendance and approval of the higher and lower nobility, the clergy and representatives of all provinces was needed. There is no direct mention of the Council in medieval sources. The most detailed description of the events that led to the downfall of Vladimir-Rasate comes from the Benedictine abbot Regino of Prüm in his work Chronicon:

Decisions
According to the historians the council was presided by Boris I and four major decisions were taken:
 Prince Vladimir-Rasate was dethroned and replaced by his brother Simeon I. Simeon, who was intended to be a high-ranking cleric or even Archbishop, was released from his monastic oath. There was also a change in the principle of succession which allowed the brother of the monarch to succeed him. Up to that time only the first-born son of the monarch was able to succeed him on the throne. That change was mentioned by John Exarch in his work Shestodnev. 
 The capital of Bulgaria was moved from Pliska to Preslav. That decision is explained with the desire of Boris I to select a capital away from Pliska where the memory of the heathen past was still very strong. In the new capital Simeon would have been surrounded by people loyal to Christianity and the pro-Slavic policy of his father. Preslav was also the site of the Panteleimon Monastery where Boris I had retired and where Simeon himself might have resided. Andreev suggests that placing the capital in Preslav was a symbolic act of breaking with paganism.
 The Byzantine clergy was to be banished from the country and replaced with Bulgarian clerics. Among the newly appointed Bulgarian bishops was Clement of Ohrid who was sent to Devol in the region of Kutmichevitsa. 
 The Old Bulgarian language was to replace the Greek in liturgy. Thus it became the official language of Bulgaria. That act was of great importance not only for Bulgaria but for the whole Slavic world.

Significance
The decisions taken during the Council of Preslav had a great impact on Bulgarian history. The official status of Old Bulgarian gave great impetus for the development of the Preslav and Ohrid Literary Schools. The Bulgarian culture and literature entered its Golden Age under the rule of the newly elected Simeon I and the country became the cultural and spiritual center of Slavic Europe. The removal of the Byzantine clergy and the Greek language from the liturgy ensured that Bulgaria would stay away from any strong or direct Byzantine influence in its policy and religious life.

The Byzantine reaction was quick. As soon as 894 emperor Leo VI moved the market of the Bulgarian merchants from Constantinople to Salonica which was a heavy blow to the Bulgarian economic interests. This inflamed the first commercial war in Europe won by Simeon I after the decisive battle of Boulgarophygon.

Notes

References

Sources
 
 
 
 
 
 
 
 
Николов, А., Факти и догадки за събора през 893 година. - В: България в световното културно наследство. Материали от Третата национална конференция по история, археология и културен туризъм "Пътуване към България" - Шумен, 17-19. 05. 2012 г. Съст. Т. Тодоров. Шумен, 2014, 229-237

First Bulgarian Empire
Preslav
Preslav
893
9th century in Bulgaria